"Back in the City" is a song by Spanish singer Alejandro Sanz and American singer Nicky Jam, from Sanz's twelfth studio album #ElDisco. The song was released by Universal Music Spain as the album's second single on 7 February 2019. The song reached number one in Nicaragua, and the top 10 in Guatemala and Venezuela.

Background
This is Sanz's first English single since "Looking for Paradise" (2009), a duet with American singer-songwriter Alicia Keys.

Music video
The music video of the song was released on 7 February 2019, featuring Sanz and Nicky Jam.

Charts

Release history

References

2019 singles
2019 songs
Alejandro Sanz songs
Nicky Jam songs
Songs written by Alejandro Sanz
Songs written by Nicky Jam
Universal Music Spain singles
Spanish-language songs
Songs written by Emilio Estefan